Grant Masters (born 2 January 1965) is an English actor and comedian known for playing the role of Martin Campbell in the Channel 4 Soap Opera Hollyoaks.

An early role came in Cider with Rosie (1998). He also played Dan in Casualty, starred as DI Glenn Mateo in the third series of Thief Takers and has had minor roles in The Bill, Doctors, Peak Practice and EastEnders, as well as other British television sitcoms. He appears on Mr. Bean as the braggadocious black belt thug on the episode: Tee Off, Mr. Bean. He starred in the 2018 sci-fi/horror film Await Further Instructions, and the 2019 sci-fi/thriller Dark Encounter.

References

                  

Living people
1965 births
English male soap opera actors
English male comedians